The 1970 Roller Hockey World Cup was the nineteenth roller hockey world cup, organized by the Fédération Internationale de Roller Sports. It was contested by 11 national teams (6 from Europe, 3 from South America, 1 from North America and 1 from Asia). All the games were played in the city of San Juan, in Argentina, the chosen city to host the World Cup.

Venue

Results

Standings

See also 
 FIRS Roller Hockey World Cup

External links 
 1970 World Cup in rink-hockey.net historical database

Roller Hockey World Cup
1970 in Argentine sport
1970 in roller hockey
R